"Tell Me" is a song co-written and recorded by American country music singer Jake Owen.  It was released in April 2010 as the third and final single from his album Easy Does It.  Owen wrote this song with Jimmy Ritchey and Don Poythress.

Critical reception
Matt Bjorke of Roughstock gave the song a positive review, praising the "introspective lyric". He also thought that the song was "miles away from the goofy come-on that was 'Eight Second Ride'."

Music video
The music video was directed by Mason Dixon and premiered in mid-2010.

Chart performance

References

2010 singles
Jake Owen songs
Songs written by Jake Owen
RCA Records Nashville singles
Songs written by Jimmy Ritchey
2009 songs